Thailand adopted the metric system on 17 December 1923. However, old Thai units are still in common use, especially for measurements of land.

Before metrication, the traditional system of measurement used in Thailand employed anthropic units. Some of these units are still in use, albeit standardised to SI/metric measurements. When the Royal Thai Survey Department began cadastral survey in 1896, Director R. W. Giblin, F.R.G.S., noted, "It so happens that 40 metres or 4,000 centimetres are equal to one sen," so all cadastral plans are plotted, drawn, and printed to a scale of 1:4,000.  The square wa, ngan and rai are still used in measurements of land area.

The baht is still used as a unit of measurement in gold trading. However, one baht of 96.5% gold bullion is defined as 15.16 grams rather than the generic standard of 15 grams. The baht has also become the name of the currency of Thailand, which was originally fixed to the corresponding mass of silver.

List of units

References

 
Thailand
Customary units of measurement
Units of measurement
Thai culture